David Nelson (born November 6, 1974) is an American curler.

Teams

References

External links

1974 births
Living people
American male curlers